Les Miracles n'ont lieu qu'une fois (Miracles Only Happen Once) is a 1951 Franco-Italian film, directed by Yves Allégret. The film is about a "psychic war-casualty" played by Jean Marais.

Synopsis
The educational year is ending and Jérôme, a medical student, is on the point of leaving on holiday to Brittany with friends. However he remains pensive and regrets not having approached Claudia, an Italian student, who must leave France the same evening. So he decides to go to her hotel. The two young people acknowledge their mutual love and Jérôme accompanies Claudia to the station and promises to join her
in Tuscany the next month, as soon as he finds enough money. In Tuscany, Jérôme realizes that he seriously loves Claudia and proposes marriage to her. The two lovers return to their hotel but the city is agitated: war has just been declared. Jérôme learns from the consulate that he has been mobilised and that he must return. Separated by the war and no longer able to correspond, Jérôme loses track of Claudia. He will try to forget her by remaking his life, but haunted by the memory of this lost love, he will not succeed. Eleven years later, he leaves for Italy to try to find her, but time has passed...

Cast
 Alida Valli as Claudia
 Jean Marais as Jérôme
 Marcelle Arnold as the bar owner
 Christine Chesnay as Jérôme's wife
 Charles Rutherford as the American
 Dedi Ristori as Little Francesca
 Aldo Moschino as the doctor
 Emma Baron as the hotel owner
 Nada Fiorelli as Maria Forni
 Gérard Buhr 
 Vera Cini
 Edmond Ardisson as an employee
 Daniel Ceccaldi as a friend of Jérôme
 Jacques Denoël as a friend of Jérôme
 Bernard Farrell (uncredited) 
 Alex Favier (uncredited) 
 Claire Gérard as the restaurant owner (uncredited)
 Françoise Prévost (uncredited) 
 Alain Raffael as a friend of Jérôme  (uncredited)
 Michele Riccardini (uncredited)

References

External links
 
 NY Times Movies page on film

1951 films
1950s Italian-language films
French black-and-white films
Italian black-and-white films
1950s Italian films